= Mana (board game) =

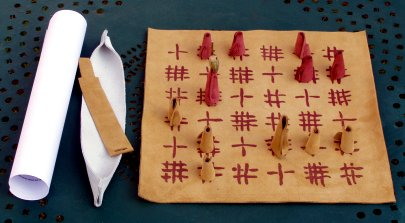
Game components

Mana is a Japanese-themed French abstract board game for two players, designed by Claude Leroy and released in 1988.

== Reviews ==
- Jeux de NIM
- Rebel Times #7
- Vin d'jeu

== Awards and honors ==
- Concours International de Createurs de Jeux de Societe (Gobelet d’Argent 1987)
- Festival de Besançon (Boucle d’argent 2002)
